Lincoln Beach is a census-designated place (CDP) in Lincoln County, Oregon, United States. It includes the unincorporated communities of Lincoln Beach and Gleneden Beach. The total population was 2,045 at the 2010 census.

Geography
It is bordered to the west by the Pacific Ocean. U.S. Route 101 runs through the CDP, leading north  to the center of Lincoln City and south  to Newport, the Lincoln county seat.

Demographics

As of the census of 2000, there were 2,078 people, 1,073 households, and 657 families residing in the CDP. The population density was 632.5 people per square mile (243.9/km2). There were 2,198 housing units at an average density of 669.1 per square mile (257.9/km2). The racial makeup of the CDP was 95.52% White, 0.10% African American, 1.40% Native American, 0.77% Asian, 0.05% Pacific Islander, 0.82% from other races, and 1.35% from two or more races. Hispanic or Latino of any race were 2.02% of the population.

There were 1,073 households, out of which 10.9% had children under the age of 18 living with them, 53.0% were married couples living together, 6.1% had a female householder with no husband present, and 38.7% were non-families. 32.1% of all households were made up of individuals, and 16.0% had someone living alone who was 65 years of age or older. The average household size was 1.93 and the average family size was 2.35.

In the CDP, the population was spread out, with 10.9% under the age of 18, 3.3% from 18 to 24, 16.0% from 25 to 44, 33.8% from 45 to 64, and 36.1% who were 65 years of age or older. The median age was 58 years. For every 100 females, there were 85.2 males. For every 100 females age 18 and over, there were 82.5 males.

The median income for a household in the CDP was $33,425, and the median income for a family was $41,415. Males had a median income of $32,557 versus $18,519 for females. The per capita income for the CDP was $21,810. About 4.0% of families and 6.9% of the population were below the poverty line, including 3.0% of those under age 18 and 2.2% of those age 65 or over.

References

Oregon Coast
Census-designated places in Oregon
Unincorporated communities in Lincoln County, Oregon
Census-designated places in Lincoln County, Oregon
Unincorporated communities in Oregon
Populated coastal places in Oregon